This article concerns the period 189 BC – 180 BC.

References